Horace Manning Haynes (born: Lyminster, Sussex –  died 3 March 1957, Epsom, England) (often credited as H. Manning Haynes) was a British-born film director and actor. He was married to the screenwriter Lydia Hayward, with whom he frequently worked.

Manning Haynes’ film career as an actor began in 1918's Lead Kindly Light. Haynes switched to directing silent films in the 1920s. He usually billed  himself professionally as H. Manning Haynes.

Selected filmography

Actor
 Home Sweet Home (1917)
 The Lost Chord (1917)
 Ave Maria (1918)
 Linked by Fate (1919)
 Jack, Sam and Pete (1919)
 Monty Works the Wires (1921)
 Stella (1921)

Director
 Monty Works the Wires (1921)
 The Skipper's Wooing (1922)
 The Head of the Family (1922)
 Sam's Boy (1922)
 A Will and a Way (1922)
 The Monkey's Paw (1923)
 The Constable’s Move (1923)
 Dixon's Return (1924)
 Lawyer Quince (1924)
 London Love (1926)
 The Ware Case (1928)
 Those Who Love (1929)
 Should a Doctor Tell? (1930)
 The Officers' Mess (1931)
 To Oblige a Lady (1931)
 The Old Man (1931)
 Love's Old Sweet Song (1933)
 The Perfect Flaw (1934)
 Tomorrow We Live (1936)
 Pearls Bring Tears (1937)
 East of Ludgate Hill (1937)

References

External links
 
The Bioscope has a post titled "In the Studio, 15 November 2009, http://bioscopic.wordpress.com/2009/11/, which shows  a still of Manning Haynes directing London Love at the Gaumont-British studios, Lime Grove, in 1926, taken from http://www.itnsource.com.  The film starred actors Fay Compton and John Stuart.

1957 deaths
English male silent film actors
English film directors
People from Lyminster
20th-century English male actors
1889 births